Psychon may refer to:
 Psychon (neurology), unit of mental activity proposed by McCulloch and Pitts in 1943
 Psychon, a fictional planet from Space: 1999
 Psychon, a concept proposed by parapsychologist Whately Carington in his 1945 book Telepathy

See also

 Lords of the Psychon, a 1963 novel by Daniel F. Galouye
Psychonomic Society
 Psychon Bull Rev, or Psychonomic Bulletin & Review